The Glommen-class was a class of two minelayers built for the Royal Norwegian Navy during the First World War at Akers Mekaniske Verksted in Oslo.

Service history
The two vessels were kept in service until the German invasion of Norway in 1940. Glommen and Laugen operated in the area around Melsomvik, and surrendered to the Germans on 14 April 1940. The Germans rebuilt both of them as floating flak batteries, and renamed them Nki-01 and Nki-02. 

References
 Naval history via FLIX: KNM Glommen, retrieved 17 March 2006
 Ships of the Norwegian navy, retrieved 17 March 2006

Mine warfare vessel classes